The Breakup Girl is a 2015 American comedy-drama film, written and directed by Stacy Sherman, making it her feature film directing debut. The film stars Shannon Woodward, Wendi McLendon-Covey, India Menuez, Joe Lo Truglio, Mary Kay Place, and Ray Wise. The film is executive produced by The Hunger Games screenwriter Billy Ray. Film may also been referred to as its original working title Claire's Cambodia.

Release
The film was released on iTunes and other Video on demand streaming services on July 10, 2015.

Plot
This "sibling comedic drama" revolves around three estranged sisters whose resentment and envy of one another is barely dented by the news that their father (Ray Wise) is terminally ill. The three sisters are: Claire (Shannon Woodward) who is dumped by her boyfriend on her birthday; Sharon (Wendi McLendon-Covey), the oldest and seemingly most settled; and Kendra (India Menuez), the youngest and emotional one.

Sherman has said that the city of Los Angeles will be a major focus of the film, stating that the city's distinct neighborhood will characterize the sisters' differences. She stated: "Los Angeles will illustrate those divisions in a comedic way".

Cast
 Shannon Woodward as Claire Baker
 Wendi McLendon-Covey as Sharon Baker
 India Menuez as Kendra Baker
 Joe Lo Truglio as Steve Baker
 Mary Kay Place as Joan Baker
 Ray Wise as Bob Baker
 Catherine Bach as Ellen
 Timm Sharp as Tim
 Nick Thune as Lewis
 Casey Wilson as Kate Lanley
 Samuel Larsen as Uri
 Natasha Leggero as Kim

References

External links
 

2015 films
2015 comedy-drama films
2010s English-language films
Films shot in California
American independent films
American comedy-drama films
2015 independent films
2010s American films